Verne C. Johnson (July 20, 1925 – November 2, 2012) was an American politician and lawyer.

Johnson was born in St. Peter, Minnesota. He graduated from Southwest High School in Minneapolis, Minnesota. Johnson served in the United States Army during World War II. He received his bachelor's degree from University of Minnesota in 1948 and his law degree from University of Minnesota Law School in 1951. He worked for General Mills and served on the staff of United States Representative Walter Judd. Johnson served in the Minnesota House of Representatives in 1953 and 1954 and was a Republican.

Notes

1925 births
2012 deaths
People from St. Peter, Minnesota
Military personnel from Minnesota
University of Minnesota alumni
University of Minnesota Law School alumni
Minnesota lawyers
General Mills people
Republican Party members of the Minnesota House of Representatives
20th-century American lawyers